Manfred Räderer is a former German curler.

Teams

References

External links
 

Living people
German male curlers
Year of birth missing (living people)